Paul Weinstein may refer to:

 Paul Weinstein (athlete) (1878–1964), German high jumper
 Paul Weinstein (economist), American economist and political adviser